The Peter and Paul Cathedral (Belarusian: Petrapaўlauskі Sabor) is the cathedral church of the Gomel diocese of the Belarusian Orthodox Church.

Located in the park of Gomel, part of the Gomel Palace and Park Ensemble.

Story 
The cathedral was founded by Archpriest John Grigorovich on October 18, 1809 in the possession of Nikolai Rumyantsev, was built in 1809-1819 in the style of classicism (architect - J. Clark). It is located on a high cape above Sozh and is visible from afar. The construction was finally completed in 1824.

After the revolution of 1917, the closure and destruction of churches began, their conversion into institutions of a different category. In 1935 the Peter and Paul Cathedral was closed. Divine services in the cathedral resumed in the 1940s, during the period of German occupation. In the 1960s, the cathedral was closed and desecrated a second time: later a planetarium was equipped in it.

In the late 1980s, the cathedral was restored, after which services were regularly held in it. On July 11, 2008, a solemn rite of presenting the icon of St. Seraphim of Sarov with a particle of relics took place in the Peter and Paul Cathedral.

References 

Buildings and structures in Gomel Region
Cathedrals in Belarus
Buildings and structures completed in 1824